Auster Pass is a high pass in the Royal Society Range, between Mount Huggins and Mount Kempe, leading into the Skelton Glacier area from McMurdo Sound (in New Zealand) . It was named by the New Zealand Northern Survey Party of the Commonwealth Trans-Antarctic Expedition (1956–58) for the RNZAF Antarctic Flight's Auster Aircraft.

References
 

Mountain passes of Victoria Land
Royal Society Range
Scott Coast